HNLMS A (Dutch: Hr.Ms. She was later re-floated and repaired by the Japanese and converted into auxiliary submarine chaser Cha-113 or No. 113 (Japanese: 第百十七號驅潜特務艇).

History
She was ordered by Royal Netherlands Navy and laid down on 13 September 1928 at the Royal Shipyard at Willemsoord, Den Helder, the first of four minesweepers in her class each denominated by a letter (HNLMS B, HNLMS C, HNLMS D). She was launched on 19 April 1929 and completed on 4 August 1930. She arrived at Surabaya on 20 October 1930 towed by the tugboats Friesland and Vlaanderen. On 28 February 1942, she was attacked and damaged by Japanese aircraft at Surabaya. On 1 March 1942, during the Battle of Java, she was scuttled by her crew at Surabaya.
 
She was raised by the Japanese and converted into submarine chaser No. 113. On 10 December 1943, her conversion was completed and she was commissioned into the Imperial Japanese Navy. She was mostly engaged in escort duties around Java. On 23 June 1945 she was torpedoed and sunk by the American submarine  along with shuttle boat No. 8333 northeast of Madura Island and southeast of the Masalembu Islands at coordinates.

References

1929 ships
Ships sunk by American submarines
Ships built in the Netherlands
Maritime incidents in June 1945
Auxiliary ships of the Imperial Japanese Navy
World War II shipwrecks in the Pacific Ocean
Submarine chasers of the Imperial Japanese Navy
Minesweepers of the Royal Netherlands Navy